Maria Louisa may refer to:

 Maria Louisa Angwin (1849–1898), Canadian physician
 Maria Louisa Bustill (1853–1904), American schoolteacher
 Maria Louisa Charlesworth (1819–1880), English religious author
 Maria Louisa Pike (d. 1892), American naturalist
 Maria Louisa Walsworth (1822–1859), American missionary

See also

 Maria Louise
 Maria Luisa
 Maria Luise
 Mary Louisa
 Marie Louise (disambiguation)
 Marie Luise
 Maria (given name)
 
 Louisa (disambiguation)
 Maria (disambiguation)